Magnus of Denmark or Magnus of Holstein ( – ) was a Prince of Denmark, Duke of Holstein, and a member of the House of Oldenburg. As a vassal of Tsar Ivan IV of Russia, he was the titular King of Livonia from 1570 to 1578.

Early life
Duke Magnus was born at the Copenhagen Castle in 1540 as the second son of King Christian III of Denmark and Norway and Dorothea of Saxe-Lauenburg. At the age of 17 he was sent to Germany to be educated at various German courts. Following the death of his father in 1559, he returned to Denmark for the coronation of his older brother, King Frederick II of Denmark.

The same year, the prince-bishop of Ösel-Wiek and Courland Johannes V von Münchhausen in Old Livonia sold his lands to King Frederick II for 30,000 thalers. To avoid hereditary partition of his lands, King Frederick II gave that territory to his younger brother Magnus on condition that he renounced his rights to succession in the duchies of Schleswig and Holstein. In 1560, Magnus landed with an army on Saaremaa where he was immediately elected bishop by the cathedral chapter.

King of Livonia

During the Livonian War, on 10 June 1570, Duke Magnus arrived in Moscow, where he was crowned King of Livonia by Ivan IV. Magnus took the oath of allegiance to Ivan as his overlord and received from the corresponding charter for the vassal kingdom of Livonia in what Ivan termed his patrimony. The treaty between Magnus and Ivan IV was signed by an oprichnik and by a member of the zemskii administration, the dyak Vasily Shchelkalov. The territories of the new kingdom still had to be conquered, but even so Põltsamaa Castle was proclaimed the future official residence of the king.

The newly crowned king Magnus of Livonia left Moscow with 20,000 Russian soldiers with the intention of conquering Swedish-controlled Reval. Ivan's hope of the support of Frederick II of Denmark, the older brother of Magnus, failed. By the end of March 1571, Magnus gave up the struggle for Reval and abandoned the siege.

In 1577, having lost Ivan's favor and receiving no support from his brother, Magnus called on the Livonian nobility to rally to him in a struggle against foreign occupation. He was attacked by Ivan's forces and taken prisoner. On his release, he renounced his royal title. Magnus gave the rights to the throne to the genus of Stephen Báthory.

Magnus spent the last six years of his life at the castle of Pilten in the Bishopric of Courland, where he died as a pensioner of the Polish crown.

In 1662, Magnus' body was returned to Denmark and was reburied in the Roskilde Cathedral.

Spouse and issue

On 12 April 1574, he married Maria Vladimirovna of Staritsa, daughter of Vladimir of Staritsa, Duke of Staritsa. His issue included:

Marie of Oldenburg (c. July 1580 – c. 1597)
Eudoxia of Oldenburg (c. 1581 – c. 1588)

Ancestry

See also
List of Rulers of Schleswig-Holstein
Livonian War

References

External links

Livonian Wars, by Kara Broughton
Die Münzen von Herzog Magnus 

1540 births
1583 deaths
Danish Lutheran bishops
People from Courland
People from Livonia
Danish princes
Estonian nobility
Livonian nobility
Norwegian princes
Prince-bishops in Livonia
Polish people of the Livonian campaign of Stephen Báthory
History of Tallinn
People from Põltsamaa
People of the Livonian War
Children of Christian III of Denmark
Burials at Roskilde Cathedral
Sons of kings